Below is a partial list of dams in Turkey separated by region.

Aegean Region
There are 45 dams in the Aegean Region, western part of Turkey.

Adıgüzel Dam, Denizli
Afşar Dam, Manisa
Akdeğirmen Dam, Afyonkarahisar
Akgedik Dam, Muğla
Akköprü Dam, Muğla
Alaçatı Dam, Izmir
Balçova Dam, Izmir
Bayır Dam, Muğla
Beşkarış Dam
Beydağ Dam
Buldan Dam
Cindere Dam
Çaltıkoru Dam
Çavdarhisar Dam
Çine Dam
Demirköprü Dam
Enne Dam
Geyik Dam
Gökpınar Dam
Gölmarmara Dam
Gördes Dam
Güzelhisar Dam
Işıklı Dam
İkizdere Dam
Karacasu Dam
Kavakdere Dam
Kayaboğazı Dam
Kemer Dam
Kestel Dam
Kureyşler Dam
Küçükler Dam
Marmaris Dam
Mumcular Dam
Örenler Dam
Seferihisar Dam
Selevir Dam
Sevişler Dam
Seyitler Dam
Söğüt Dam
Tahtalı Dam
Topçam Dam
Ürkmez Dam
Yaylakavak Dam
Yenidere Dam
Yortanlı Dam

Black Sea Region 
There are 54 dams in the Black Sea Region, northern part of Turkey.

Alaca Dam, Çorum
Almus Dam, Tokat
Alpu Dam, Tokat
Altınkaya Dam, Samsun
Ataköy Dam, Tokat
Atasu Dam, Trabzon
Arkun Dam
Artvin Dam
Belpınar Dam
Beyler Dam
Bezirgan Dam
Borçka Dam
Boyabat Dam
Boztepe Dam
Çakmak Dam
Çatak Dam
Çorum Dam
Demirözü Dam
Derbent Dam
Deriner Dam
Derinöz Dam
Dodurga Dam
Erfelek Dam
Germeçtepe Dam
Gölköy Dam
Gülüç Dam
Güzelce Dam
Hasan Uğurlu Dam
Hasanlar Dam
Hatap Dam
Karaçomak Dam
Karadere Dam
Kızılcapınar Dam
Kirazlıköprü Dam
Koçhisar Dam
Koruluk Dam
Kozlu Dam
Köprübaşı Dam
Köse Dam
Kulaksızlar Dam
Kürtün Dam
Muratlı Dam
Obruk Dam
Ondokuzmayıs Dam
Saraydüzü Dam
Sarayözü Dam
Suat Uğurlu Dam
Topçam Dam
Tortum Dam
Torul Dam
Uluköy Dam
Vezirköprü Dam
Yedikır Dam
Yenihayat Dam

Central Anatolia Region
There are 75 dams in the Central Anatolia Region, central part of Turkey.

4 Eylül Dam, Sivas
Ağcaşar Dam, Kayseri
Akhasan Dam, Çankırı
Akkaya Dam, Niğde
Akköy Dam, Kayseri
Akyar Dam, Ankara
Altınapa Dam, Konya
Altınhisar Dam, Niğde
Apa Dam, Konya
Asartepe Dam, Ankara
Aşağı Karaören Dam
Ayhanlar Dam, Nevşehir
Ayrancı Dam, Karaman
Bahçelik Dam, Kayseri
Bayındır Dam, Ankara
Beylikova Dam
Bozkır Dam
Çamlıdere Dam
Çamlıgöze Dam
Çatören Dam
Çoğun Dam
Çubuk-1 Dam
Çubuk-2 Dam
Damsa Dam
Deliçay Dam
Derebucak Dam
Doyduk Dam
Eğrekkaya Dam
Ermenek Dam
Gazibey Dam
Gebere Dam, Niğde
Gelingüllü Dam
Gödet Dam
Gökçekaya Dam, Eskişehir
Gölova Dam
Güldürcek Dam
Gümüşler Dam
Gürsöğüt Dam
Hirfanlı Dam
İbrala Dam
İmranlı Dam
İvriz Dam
Kapulukaya Dam
Karacalar Dam
Karaova Dam
Kargı Dam
Kaymaz Dam
Kesikköprü Dam
Kılıçkaya Dam, Sivas
Kovalı Dam
Kunduzlar Dam
Kurtboğazı Dam
Kuzfındık Dam
Kültepe Dam
Maksutlu Dam
Mamasın Dam
May Dam
Mursal Dam
Murtaza Dam
Musaözü Dam
Özen Dam
Porsuk Dam
Sarımsaklı Dam
Sarıoğlan Dam
Sarıyar Dam, Ankara
Sıddıklı Dam
Sille Dam, Konya
Süreyyabey Dam
Tatlarin Dam
Uzunlu Dam
Yahyasaray Dam
Yapıaltın Dam
Yenice Dam
Yeşilburç Dam

Eastern Anatolia Region
There are 40 dams in the Eastern Anatolia Region, eastern part of Turkey

Alpaslan-1 Dam, Muş
Alpaslan-2 Dam, Muş
Arpaçay Dam, Kars
Bağıştaş 1 Dam
Bağıştaş 2 Dam
Başköy Dam, Erzurum
Bayburt Dam, Kars
Beyhan I Dam
Beyhan II Dam, planned, Elazığ
Boztepe Dam
Cip Dam
Çamgazi Dam
Çat Dam
Çıldır Dam
Demirdöven Dam
Dilimli Dam
Erzincan Dam
Gayt Dam
Gülbahar Dam
Kalecik Dam
Kapıkaya Dam
Keban Dam, Elazığ
Kığı Dam
Koçköprü Dam
Kuzgun Dam
Medik Dam
Morgedik Dam
Özlüce Dam
Palandöken Dam
Patnos Dam
Pazaryolu Dam
Pembelik Dam
Polat Dam
Sarımehmet Dam
Seyrantepe Dam
Sultansuyu Dam
Sürgü Dam
Tatar Dam
Tercan Dam
Uzunçayır Dam
Yazıcı Dam
Yedisu Dam
Yoncalı Dam
Zernek Dam

Marmara Region
There are 50 dams in the Marmara Region, northwestern part of Turkey.

Alibey Dam, Istanbul
Altınyazı Dam, Edirne
Armağan Dam, Kırklareli
Atikhisar Dam, Çanakkale
Ayvacık Dam, Çanakkale
Babasultan Dam, Bursa
Bakacak Dam, Çanakkale
Bayramdere Dam
Bayramiç Dam
Boğazköy Dam
Büyükçekmece Dam
Büyükorhan Dam
Çakmak Dam
Çamköy Dam
Çaygören Dam
Çınarcık Dam
Çokal Dam
Darıdere Dam
Darlık Dam
Demirtaş Dam
Devecikonağı Dam
Doğancı-1 Dam
Doğancı-2 Dam
Elmalı-2 Dam
Gökçe Dam
Gökçeada Dam
Gölbaşı Dam
Gölpazarı Dam
Gönen Dam
Günyurdu Dam
Hamzadere Dam
Hasanağa Dam
Havran Dam
İkizcetepeler Dam
Kadıköy Dam
Karaidemir Dam
Kayalıköy Dam
Kırklareli Dam
Kızıldamlar Dam
Kirazdere Dam
Koyuntepe Dam
Madra Dam
Manyas Dam
Ömerli Dam
Sarıbeyler Dam
Sazlıdere Dam
Sultanköy Dam
Süloğlu Dam
Taşoluk Dam
Tayfur Dam
Terkos Dam
Umurbey Dam
Valide Dam, Istanbul

Mediterranean Region
There are 41 dams in the Mediterranean Region, southern part of Turkey, with 1 dam under construction

Adatepe Dam, Kahramanmaraş
Alakır Dam, Antalya
Alaköprü Dam
Aslantaş Dam, Osmaniye
Ayvalı Dam, Kahramanmaraş
Bademli Dam, Burdur
Belkaya Dam
Berdan Dam
Berke Dam, Osmaniye
Çatalan Dam
Çavdır Dam
Çayboğazı Dam
Dim Dam
Friendship Dam
Gezende Dam
Göktaş Dam
Kadıncık 1
Kadıncık 2
Kalecik Dam
Karacaören-1 Dam
Karacaören-2 Dam
Karaçal Dam
Karamanlı Dam
Kartalkaya Dam
Kavşak Bendi Dam
Kayraktepe Dam
Kılavuzlu Dam
Kızılsu Dam
Kopru Dam
Korkuteli Dam
Kozan Dam
Kozağacı Dam
Manavgat Dam
Mehmetli Dam
Menzelet Dam
Nergizlik Dam
Onaç-1 Dam
Onaç-2 Dam
Otluca HES
Oymapınar Dam, Antalya
Seyhan Dam, Adana
Sır Dam, Kahramanmaraş
Silifke HES
Sorgun Dam
Sücüllü Dam
Tahtaköprü Dam
Uluborlu Dam
Yapraklı Dam
Yarseli Dam
Yayladağ Dam

Southeastern Anatolia Region
There are 20 dams in the Southeastern Anatolia Region, eastern part of Turkey, with a further 9 dams under construction and 5 dams planned.

Alkumru Dam
Aslandağ Dam, Hakkâri
Atatürk Dam, Adıyaman and Şanlıurfa
Balli Dam, Şırnak
Batman Dam, Batman
Beyyurdu Dam, Hakkâri
Birecik Dam, Şanlıurfa
Burç Bendi Dam
Çetintepe Dam, Şırnak, under construction
Çetin Dam, Siirt, under construction
Cizre Dam, planned
Çocuktepe Dam,  Hakkâri, under construction
Çukurca Dam, planned
Devegeçidi Dam, Diyarbakır
Dicle Dam, Diyarbakır
Doğanlı Dam, planned
Dumluca Dam
Erkenek Dam
Göksu Dam
Hacıhıdır Dam
Hakkari Dam, planned
Hancağız Dam
Ilısu Dam, Şırnak
Upper Kaleköy Dam
Lower Kaleköy Dam, planned
Karakaya Dam, Diyarbakır and Mardin
Karkamış Dam, Gaziantep
Kavşaktepe Dam, Şırnak, under construction
Kayacık Dam
Kirazlık Dam, Siirt
Kralkızı Dam, Batman
Musatepe Dam, Şırnak, under construction
Pinar Dam
Seve Dam
Silopi Dam, Şırnak
Silvan Dam, under construction
Sırımtaş Dam
Şırnak Dam, Şırnak
Uludere Dam, Şırnak, under construction

External links 
Official website of State Hydraulic Works (DSİ)

 
Dams and reservoirs
Turkey